Claudio Mamerto Cuenca (30 October 1812 – 3 February 1852) was an Argentine physician and poet.

The Spanish mercenary José Pons Ojeda (who called himself "León de Palleja"), who belonged to the Grand Army of General Justo José de Urquiza who fought Rosas in 1852, killed him to saber blows because Cuenca wanted to protect the wounded in his field hospital, immediately after the battle of Caseros.

Biography 

Claudio Mamerto Cuenca was born in Buenos Aires, the son of Justo Casimiro Cuenca and Lucía Calvo. His baptismal name was Claudio José del Corazón de Jesús Cuenca, and it is not known for what reason he changed it to Claudio Mamerto Cuenca. He did his first letters in the parish house to enter the Real Colegio de San Carlos (current Colegio Nacional de Buenos Aires) at the age of 16,
that in those years it was merged with the Conciliar Seminary, directed by the Jesuits and worked next to the temple of San Ignacio. An excellent student, he graduated from high school with outstanding grades and four years later he entered the Medical Department of the University of Buenos Aires. His teachers in medicine, including doctors Francisco Cosme Argerich and Raúl Cristóbal Montúfar, among others, trained ―despite the precariousness of the time― outstanding doctors.
At the University of Buenos Aires he had as teachers Diego Alcorta, León Banegas and Miguel García, and in medicine, Ireneo Portela, Gómez de Fonseca , Francisco de Paula Almeyra, Juan José Fontana and Fuentes Arguibel.
In the Hospital de la Residencia, lectures were given for the study of specific subjects, but many times, "the teacher's house was the right place to develop classes with the help of figures and anatomical atlases."

This situation discouraged young people, who took other paths (such as commerce). Despite this, the Cuenca family was characterized by the decision of four of his five children, José María, Claudio Mamerto, Salustiano and Amaro, to become doctors. Claudio and Salustiano managed to stand out. The latter, following in the footsteps of the former, became an outstanding surgeon, and upon his death he succeeded him in the Chair of Anatomy and Physiology. He will die during the cholera epidemic of 1859.

On 30 October 1838, Claudio Cuenca (26 years old) received his medical degree and began acting as a professional 
He then wrote a thesis which he called  Booklet  about sympathies in general, and obtained the title of Doctor of Medicine.
Doctors Juan A. Fernández, Almería, Gómez de Fonseca and others contributed to his training 
He finished his studies in 1839.
In 1840, when Dr. Ireneo Portela emigrated for political reasons, Cuenca was named his substitute in the chair of Anatomy and Physiology.

He developed a professional and teaching career.

In 1844, Cuenca published a biography of Dr. José M. Gómez de Fonseca. in the Argentine Press.

In 1845 he was director of thesis of doctor Guillermo Rawson.

When Dr. Ventura Bosch ―personal physician of Juan Manuel de Rosas― left for Europe, Dr. Cuenca came second in the list of professionals who could succeed him, along with Dr. Juan José Montes de Oca and with a French doctor named Solier, of great prestige. However, Rosas preferred it and Dr. Cuenca began to work for him.

In 1851 he was appointed Surgeon Major of the Army 
Without prejudice to this, he developed at the University of Buenos Aires the chairs of anatomy, physiology, medical material and surgery.
Simultaneously with his profession, he assiduously cultivated letters, but also with demure silence.
He composed epigrams, idylls, madrigals, comedies, dramas, etc.
Cuenca was intimately adverse to Rosas's politics, and this was pointed out in his poetic production.
In the eyes of society, the young doctor devoted himself fully to his profession and to the dictation of his chair. Nothing allowed to perceive the hidden drama that tormented him of having to be part of Rosas's men and in his intimacy he vented spiritually with his prolific literary production, production that he knows all the styles and that he keeps hidden.

And so, having become the personal physician and chief surgeon of the Rosas army, he poured his true feelings into his poems -poems that he carried permanently in a briefcase that he did not take off even when sleeping, since he often used it as a pillow.

In compliance with his military obligations, his role as a doctor finds him in the Battle of Caseros on 3 February 1852, attending the "blood hospital" built behind the Palomar de Caseros.

General Justo José de Urquiza then ordered the Uruguayan general César Díaz (39) to attack. In the company was, with the rank of colonel, the Spanish mercenary José Pons Ojeda (36), who called himself "León de Palleja".

Cuenca died in the arms of doctors Claudio Mejía and Nicomedes Reynal.
Dr. Claudio Mejía, companion and faithful friend of Cuenca, was taken prisoner by Urquiza's forces, but managed to recover to be the corpse – with saber wounds to the head, shoulders and arms, and a stab in the belly – and the inseparable briefcase of his friend with his poetic work. A poem titled Mi cara was found in a pocket of the military doctor's jacket:

No official part reported Cuenca's death. According to Dr. Corbella, "the complicit silence of some characters who were actors in the taking of the Palomar and who could well [...] publicly mourn Cuenca's death but did not do so" is striking.

Cuenca was buried on the spot, but eight months later, on 10 September 1852,
his friends had him exhumed and transferred his remains to the Recoleta Cemetery, in the vault of his sister Eulogia's family, the Mugicas. Once that act was completed, the pain of his family, that of his friends and that of María Atkins, his fiancée, remained floating.

In 1861, the poet Heraclio C. Fajardo compiled and published his poetry in three volumes.
Among these stood out Visión, To Córdoba, El pampero, El corazón, To the oath of independence and ' 'Deliriums of the heart'.

In 1889, the Garnier publishing house, from Paris (France), published his "Selected Poetic Works" in Spanish, with a biography written by Dr. Teodoro Álvarez.

Tributes 

Several places in Argentina are named after him:

 A street in the town of El Palomar, where he died.
 A street in the town of Olivos.
 A street in the city of Buenos Aires, which first bore the name of Barcelona, ​​and after Juárez Celman. On November 27, 1893, Claudio Cuenca was named.
 A street in the city of Córdoba
 The Sarmiento railway station in the town of Tres Algarrobos (province of Buenos Aires) is called Estación Cuenca.

References 

1812 births
1852 deaths
Argentine military doctors